Kava (also Romanized as Kavā, Kevā, and Kovā; also known as  Kavaz) is a village in Ashrestaq Rural District, Yaneh Sar District, Behshahr County, Mazandaran Province, Iran. According to the 2006 census, its population is 299 people in 68 families.

References 

Populated places in Behshahr County